Grangetown may refer to:

 Grangetown, Cardiff, a district and community in Wales
 Grangetown (Cardiff electoral ward), a ward in Cardiff
 Grangetown, North Yorkshire, Redcar and Cleveland, England
 Grangetown, Tyne and Wear, Sunderland, England